2022 Tamil Nadu urban local body elections, to the Local civic bodies in Tamil Nadu were held in urban areas in the month of February 2022. The Greater Chennai Corporation, alongside 20 other municipal corporations of Tamil Nadu, went to polling on 19 February 2022 to elect councillors to represents the wards in the respective cities; the elected councillors will choose a mayor from amongst themselves.

Seats

Election results
Counting of votes commenced on 22 February 2022. Official results were published on Tamil Nadu State Election Commission website.

Chennai
The seats of the Mayor, Deputy Mayor and the Greater Chennai Corporation Council had been vacant since 2016. The Greater Chennai Corporation went to polling on 19 February 2022, to elect 200 councillors to represent the city's 200 wards; the councillors choose one amongst themselves as the Mayor of Chennai, a historically significant, coveted office. The Government of Tamil Nadu had announced that the Mayor's seat has been reserved for a Scheduled Caste woman this time. The election results were announced on 22 February 2022 by the Tamil Nadu State Election Commission. The Dravida Munnetra Kazhagam (DMK) won 153 out of the total 200 wards in Chennai, with the other parties in its Secular Progressive Alliance winning 25 more seats—13 for Indian National Congress, four for Communist Party of India – Marxist (CPI-M), four for Viduthalai Chiruthaigal Katchi (VCK), two for Marumalarchi Dravida Munnetra Kazhagam (MDMK), one each for Communist Party of India (CPI) and Indian Union Muslim League (IUML). The All India Anna Dravida Munnetra Kazhagam (AIADMK) won 15 seats. The Bharatiya Janata Party (BJP), the ruling party of the Union Government of India, won one seat. The Amma Makkal Munnettra Kazagam (AMMK) also won a seat. Aside parties, five independent candidates won in their respective wards. The councillors formally elected the Mayor and the Deputy Mayor on 4 March 2022. Having secured an absolute majority, the DMK's mayoral candidate Priya Rajan became the 46th Mayor of Chennai, unopposed. She is the youngest mayor in Chennai's history (aged 28), and the first Dalit woman to hold the office.

Coimbatore

DMK and its allies in the Secular Progressive Alliance, won 96 wards out of total 100 wards in the Coimbatore Municipal Corporation election. The DMK won 76 and its allies 20. Among the allies of DMK, Congress won nine, CPI(M) and CPI - four each, and MDMK three wards. The incumbent ruling party in the Coimbtore corporation council, AIADMK won three seats. Social Democratic Party of India won 1 ward.

Win percentage 
The percentage of winning candidates from each parties in the election.

Party-wise

References

 

Elections in Tamil Nadu
2020s in Tamil Nadu
T
Local government in Tamil Nadu
Local elections in Tamil Nadu